The straight face test (also laugh test or giggle test) is a test of whether something is legitimate or serious based on whether a given statement or legal argument can be made sincerely, without any compulsion to laugh. The phrase goes back to about 1987.

See also 
Rational basis review

References

External links
No Laughing Matter: Failing the Giggle Test Might Leave You Crying, ABA Journal,  Nov 01, 2011. Accessed 05/30/2015.

Informal legal terminology
Tests
Legal reasoning